Hornburg is a town and a former municipality in the Wolfenbüttel district, in the German state of Lower Saxony.  Since 1 November 2013, it is part of the municipality Schladen-Werla. It is situated at the Ilse river, a tributary of the Oker. Hornburg is part of the Samtgemeinde ("collective municipality") Schladen and home to numerous historically valuable half-timber buildings (Fachwerkhäuser). It is located on the German Timber-Frame Road.

Hornburg Castle was first mentioned in a 994 deed as a property of the Bishopric of Halberstadt. In 1005 it was the birthplace of Pope Clement II. The fortress located on a limestone plateau served to control the northern border of the bishopric and the trade routes from Halberstadt to Braunschweig and Hildesheim. It was devastated by Henry the Lion in 1179 during his conflict with the bishop, an ally of Emperor Frederick I Barbarossa, who had the castle rebuilt.

In 1528 the attached settlement was denoted as a town by the Halberstadt bishops, it received market rights in 1552. At the same time Hornburg, thriving from the cultivation of humulus (hop) for beer brewing, was surrounded by a town wall including five gates. The ensemble of about 400 Renaissance timber-framed houses arose after a blaze in 1512 had devastated nearly all of Hornburg's buildings. The reconstruction of the town with elaborately carved Fachwerk houses was modeled after the townscape of Halberstadt. With the bishopric Hornburg turned Protestant in 1540. The parish church Beatae Mariae Virginis is considered one of the first Lutheran hall churches in the region. During the Thirty Years' War Hornburg was occupied by the Imperial field marshal Johann Tserclaes von Tilly in 1626, but conquered by Swedish troops in 1630. In 1645 the Swedish military Hans Christoff von Königsmarck finally had the castle destroyed. The current building is a reconstruction on a private initiative or Georg Lüdecke in 1927, based on an engraving by Merian from around 1650 with plans by Bodo Ebhardt.

With the secularization of the Halberstadt bishopric in 1648, Hornburg fell to the electors of Brandenburg and after the 1815 Congress of Vienna it became part of the Prussian province of Saxony. Hornburg stayed a Prussian town until 1941, when it was attached to the Free State of Brunswick in the course of the establishment of the City of Salzgitter. Therefore, at the end of World War II Hornburg found itself in British occupation zone and later became a West German town.

Twin town
 Osterwieck, Germany

References

External links
 Official Webpage

Wolfenbüttel (district)
Former municipalities in Lower Saxony